The 2020 ATP Finals (also known as the 2020 Nitto ATP Finals for sponsorship reasons) was a men's tennis tournament played at the O2 Arena in London, United Kingdom, from 15 to 22 November 2020. It was the season-ending event for the highest-ranked singles players and doubles teams on the 2020 ATP Tour. This was the final year that London hosted the event. On 14 August 2020, it was announced the tournament would be held without spectators in attendance following guidelines imposed due to the COVID-19 pandemic in the United Kingdom.

The tournament took place from 15 to 22 November at the O2 Arena in London, United Kingdom. It was the 51st edition of the tournament (46th in doubles). The tournament was run by the Association of Tennis Professionals (ATP) and was part of the 2020 ATP Tour. The event took place on indoor hard courts. It served as the season-ending championships for players on the ATP Tour.

In singles (and in doubles with teams in place of individual players), the eight players who qualified for the event were split into two groups of four. During this stage, players competed in a round-robin format. The two players in each group with the best results, including head-to-head records, progressed to the semifinals, where the winners of a group faced the runners-up of the other group. This stage, however, was a knock-out stage.

Champions

Singles

 Daniil Medvedev def.  Dominic Thiem, 4–6, 7–6(7–2), 6–4.

Doubles

 Wesley Koolhof /  Nikola Mektić def.  Jürgen Melzer /  Édouard Roger-Vasselin 6–2, 3–6, [10–5].

Day-by-day summaries

Singles group

Doubles group

Format

The ATP Finals had a round-robin format, with eight players/teams divided into two groups of four. The eight seeds were determined by the ATP rankings and ATP Doubles Team Rankings on the Monday after the last ATP Tour tournament of the calendar year. All singles matches, including the final, were best of three sets with tie-breaks in each set including the third. All doubles matches were two sets (no ad) and a Match Tie-break.

Points and prize money
The ATP Finals currently (2020) rewards the following points and prize money, per victory:

 RR is the points or prize money won in the round robin stage.
 1 Prize money for doubles is per team.
 An undefeated champion would earn the maximum 1,500 points, and $2,114,000 in singles or $354,500 in doubles.

Qualification

Singles
Eight players compete at the tournament, with two named alternates. Players receive places in the following order of precedence:
 First, the top 7 players in the ATP Race to London on the Monday after the final tournament of the ATP Tour, that is, after the 2020 Sofia Open.
 Second, up to two 2020 Grand Slam tournament winners ranked anywhere 8th–20th, in ranking order
 Third, the eighth ranked player in the ATP rankings
In the event of this totaling more than 8 players, those lower down in the selection order become the alternates. If further alternates are needed, these players are selected by the ATP.

Provisional rankings are published weekly as the ATP Race to London, coinciding with the 52-week rolling ATP rankings on the date of selection. Points are accumulated in Grand Slam, ATP Tour and ATP Challenger Tour tournaments from the 52 weeks prior to the selection date, with points from the previous years Tour Finals excluded. Players accrue points across 18 tournaments, usually made up of:

 The 4 Grand Slam tournaments
 The 8 mandatory ATP Masters tournaments
 The best results from any 6 other tournaments that carry ranking points

All players must include the ranking points for mandatory Masters tournaments for which they are on the original acceptance list and for all Grand Slams for which they would be eligible, even if they do not compete (in which case they receive zero points). Furthermore, players who finished 2017 in the world's top 30 are commitment players who must (if not injured) include points for the 8 mandatory Masters tournament regardless of whether they enter, and who must compete in at least 4 ATP 500 tournaments (though the Monte Carlo Masters may count to this total), of which one must take place after the US Open.  Zero point scores may also be taken from withdrawals by non-injured players from ATP 500 tournaments according to certain other conditions outlined by the ATP. Beyond these rules, however, a player may substitute his next best tournament result for missed Masters and Grand Slam tournaments.

Players may have their ATP Tour Masters 1000 commitment reduced by one tournament, by reaching each of the following milestones:
 600 tour level matches (as of January 1, 2020),
 12 years of service,
 31 years of age (as of January 1, 2020).
If a player satisfies all three of these conditions, their mandatory ATP Tour Masters 1000 commitment is dropped entirely. Players must be in good standing as defined by the ATP as to avail of the reduced commitment.

The ATP Cup will count as an additional event in a player's rankings breakdown.

Doubles
Eight teams compete at the tournament, with one named alternates. The eight competing teams receive places according to the same order of precedence as in Singles. The named alternate will be offered first to any unaccepted teams in the selection order, then to the highest ranked unaccepted team, and then to a team selected by the ATP. Points are accumulated in the same competitions as for the Singles tournament. However, for Doubles teams there are no commitment tournaments, so teams are ranked according to their 18 highest points scoring results from any tournaments.

Qualified players

Singles

Doubles

Points breakdown

Singles
On 16 March 2020, the ATP rankings were frozen due to the COVID-19 pandemic. As a result of this pandemic, the ATP changed its ranking system for 2020 as the promotion for the 2020 ATP Race is no longer valid. The ATP rankings of 9 November 2020 will be used for the ATP Finals singles qualification.  

Players in gold (*) have qualified for the ATP Finals.
Players in brown (x) have withdrawn from the ATP Finals.

Note: Ranking points in italics indicate that a player did not qualify for (or used an exemption to skip) a Grand Slam or Masters 1000 event and substituted his next best result in its place.

Below is the unofficial ATP Race ranking for only 2020 events.

Doubles
Teams in gold have qualified for the ATP Finals.

Note: The US Open doubles points breakdown was the same as an ATP Masters 1000 because of a reduced 32-draw size.

Head-to-head
Below are the head-to-head records as they approached the tournament.

Singles 
Overall

Indoor hardcourt

Doubles

See also
ATP rankings
2020 WTA Finals
2020 Next Generation ATP Finals

References

External links
  
 ATP tournament profile

 
Finals
2020
2020 ATP World Tour Finals
2020 ATP World Tour Finals
ATP World Tour Finals
2020 in English tennis
ATP World Tour Finals